Seidemann is a surname. Notable people with the surname include:

Bob Seidemann (1941–2017), American graphic artist and photographer
Hans Seidemann (1901–1967), German general during World War II
Melissa Seidemann (born 1990), American water polo player
Siegfried Seidemann, East German slalom canoeist in the late 1950s
Ulricke Seidemann (born 1955), German chess master

See also
Scheidemann
Seidelmann (disambiguation)
Seidman (disambiguation)